Albert Edward Walker Evans (4 June 1914 – 20 December 2001) was an English film and television actor.

During the Second World War, he served with the British Army in North Africa and Italy, attaining the rank of Captain.

Evans featured as Bob Grove in the 1950s soap opera The Grove Family and played the role of Lionel Petty in Coronation Street during 1965–66.

He also appeared in episodes of Dixon of Dock Green, The Saint, Doctor Who, Z-Cars and Dad's Army.

Selected filmography

 London Belongs to Me (1948) - Detective Sergeant Taylor
 The Small Voice (1948) - Police Inspector
 The Case of Charles Peace (1949) - Police Sergeant (uncredited)
 Mr. Denning Drives North (1952) - Second Patrolman
 Secret People (1952) - Plain Clothes Man
 13 East Street (1952) - Van Driver (uncredited)
 I Believe in You (1952) - Clerk of the Court (uncredited)
 Hindle Wakes (1952) - Chauffeur
 Cosh Boy (1953) - Sgt. Woods
 Time Bomb (1953) - Policeman at Station (uncredited)
 The Yellow Balloon (1953) - PC Patterson (uncredited)
 Appointment in London (1953) - A.C. Bridges (uncredited)
 Deadly Nightshade (1953) - Publican (uncredited)
 Grand National Night (1953) - Garage Attendant
 Turn the Key Softly (1953) - Commissionaire (uncredited)
 Valley of Song (1953) - Davies
 Escape by Night (1953) - Publican (uncredited)
 The Angel Who Pawned Her Harp (1954) - Sergeant Lane
 Man of the Moment (1955) - Bob Grove (uncredited)
 It's a Great Day (1955) - Bob Grove
 The Man Upstairs (1958) - Fire Brigade Officer
 The Bridal Path (1959) - Innkeeper
 The Trials of Oscar Wilde (1960) - Sydney
 Reach for Glory (1962)
 Two and Two Make Six (1962) - Mack
 Blind Corner (1963) - Chauffeur
 Two a Penny (1967) - Jenkins
 Till Death Us Do Part (1969) - Jim (shopkeeper)
 Vendetta for the Saint (1969) - The Bank Manager
 One More Time (1970) - Gordon
 10 Rillington Place (1971) - Police: Det. Inspector
 Sunday Bloody Sunday (1971) - Husband at Hospital
 Tales from the Crypt (1972) - Constable Ramsey (segment 3 "Poetic Justice")
 Out of Season (1975) - Charlie
 Lifeforce (1985) - Doctor

References

External links

1914 births
2001 deaths
English male film actors
English male television actors
People from Putney
Male actors from London
British Army officers
British Army personnel of World War II